Randhir Singh  (16 August 1957 – 9 March 2023) was an Indian cricketer. He played two One Day Internationals for India against England and West Indies in 1981 and 1983.

Singh was born in Delhi on 16 August 1957. He died in Jamshedpur on 9 March 2023, at the age of 65.

References

1957 births
2023 deaths
Indian cricketers
Cricketers from Delhi
India One Day International cricketers
East Zone cricketers
Odisha cricketers
Bihar cricketers